Ostashev is a surname. Notable people with the surname include:

 Arkady Ostashev (1925–1998), Soviet/Russian space scientist
 Yevgeny Ostashev (1924–1960), Soviet/Russian missile scientist

Russian-language surnames